Nathan Whiting (4 May 1724, Windham, Connecticut – 9 April 1771) was a soldier and merchant in Colonial America.

Biography 
Whiting's parents died while he was a child, and he was raised by father's sister Mary and her husband, Reverend Thomas Clap. Whiting would graduate from Yale in 1743 while his uncle Thomas was president of the university.

In 1745 Ensign Nathan Whiting joined the New England army being raised to capture Fortress Louisbourg from the French. After his service in King George's War, he became a merchant in New Haven, Connecticut. In 1750 Nathan married Mary Saltonstall. They would have eight children together.

At the start of the French and Indian War, Whiting was appointed as Lieutenant Colonel of the 2nd Connecticut Provincial Regiment. During the Battle of Lake George on September 8, 1755, the 2nd Regiment and the Massachusetts regiment of Col. Ephraim Williams were marching between Lake George and Fort Edward 14 miles away, when their column was ambushed by an army of French and their Indian allies. With the death of Col. Williams, Col. Whiting led the survivors back to Sir William Johnson's camp at Lake George.  There the Colonial army held off the French attacks until men from Joseph Blanchard's New Hampshire Provincial Regiment attacked the rear of the French army and captured the French commander Jean Erdman, Baron Dieskau.

In 1756 Whiting was promoted to full Colonel in the Connecticut militia. In 1757 his provincial regiment was at Fort at Number 4 on the Connecticut River in New Hampshire guarding the frontier. After the war Col. Whiting served in the Connecticut General Assembly until his death on 9 April 1771. He is buried at the Grove Street Cemetery, New Haven.

References 

1724 births
1771 deaths
People of Connecticut in the French and Indian War
People of colonial Connecticut
Burials at Grove Street Cemetery
People from Windham, Connecticut
Military personnel from Connecticut